Maanaadu is a 2021 Indian Tamil-language science fiction action thriller film written and directed by Venkat Prabhu and produced by Suresh Kamatchi. The film stars Silambarasan, S. J. Suryah and Kalyani Priyadarshan alongside S. A. Chandrasekhar, Y. G. Mahendran, Karunakaran, Premgi Amaren, Aravind Akash and Anjena Kirti in supporting roles. The film's music and score is composed by Yuvan Shankar Raja, with cinematography handled by Richard M. Nathan and editing done by Praveen K. L (in his 100th film). It revolves around a common man and a police officer, whom are trapped in a time loop, at the day of a public conference of the chief minister and forced to live the same day over and over again.

The project was announced in July 2018, marking Prabhu's maiden collaboration with Silambarasan. During the extensive pre-production work, the producer ousted Silambarasan from the project in August 2019, citing his unprofessional behaviour, and the latter announced another project under the title Maghaa Maanaadu in that month, which he had dropped. The issue was resolved in November 2019, after Silambarasan agreed to allot his dates for the film.

Filming began on 19 February 2020 at Chennai, following a preliminary announcement about the cast and crew. Despite shooting being affected twice due to the restrictions followed during the first and second wave of the COVID-19 pandemic, the makers wrapped the shooting of the film within July 2021, taking only 68 working days for shooting. It was filmed extensively in Chennai, with sporadic schedules taking place in Pondicherry, Yercaud and Hosur.

Maanaadu was theatrically released worldwide on 25 November 2021. It received positive reviews from critics. The film was highlighted for the integration of the time-loop concept with commercial elements, with many publications calling it one of the best Tamil films of 2021. It was declared as critically and commercially successful at the box office. A sequel is confirmed by Venkat Prabhu with the main cast returning.

Plot 
Abdul Khaliq, an NRI, is on his way via flight to Coimbatore from Delhi, to reach Ooty. He is going to help his friend Eswaramoorthy elope with his lover Zarina Begum on the day of her marriage with the help of his other friend Syed Basha. He gets his co-passenger Seethalakshmi to join him after it is revealed that she is actually the groom's friend in Zarina's wedding. The next afternoon, They elope and escape from the bride's family in pursuit after them. On the way to the registrar's office, an unknown man suddenly falls on their car. 

The man is revealed to have been pursued by the cops headed by Inspector John. They are subsequently interned extrajudicially on the orders of corrupt DCP Dhanushkodi. Khaliq is forced by Dhanushkodi and John to attend a scheduled political gathering with CM Arivazhagan present and is instructed to shoot Arivazhagan with a pistol else his friends would die, Khaliq reluctantly shoots Arivazhagan. John shoots Khaliq dead in the enduring chaos, despite his protests against his actions. Khaliq awakens only to find himself in the mid-flight where he was on the start of that day and proceeds to relive all the distinct incidents of that morning. 

After attempting to help Eswaramoorthy elope again, he finds himself in the same spot where the police had previously accosted him. Khaliq is shocked to find the unknown man named Rafiq from his previous experience. Rafiq enters his car attempting to flee the police. The police catch up to them and Khaliq is shot dead by Dhanushkodi this time. Khaliq finds himself mid-flight once again, failing to realise he is looping in time. He attempts to take a different path and prevent interacting with the police, but he eventually dies at the hands of Zarina's brother Mansoor. He wakes up mid-flight once again and finally realises that he is trapped in a time loop. 

Khaliq explains the matter to his friends and Seethalakshmi who tells him about the stories of time looping and Ujjain's Kaal-Bhairav, the Hindu lord of time. Khaliq realises how he, having been born in Ujjain in Kaal-Bhairav's temple, might be behind the time loop (Khaliq looping at the same spot is the result of the aircraft flying over Ujjain at that moment) and that he has to reach a set objective to escape the loop. Khaliq begins investigating the political gathering once again and sees a cameraman shoot at Arivazhagan with a disguised sniper rifle. Using the time loop to his advantage, Khaliq locates the hitman and restrains him to prevent the assassination. 

However, Arivazhagan is killed in an IED bombing while leaving the gathering. Frustrated, Khaliq confronts Dhanushkodi and laments that Arivazhagan's assassination would lead to a dangerous religious riot and cause further societal conflict. It is revealed that Dhanushkodi has also been stuck in a time loop when his blood accidentally transfused into Khaliq as he was wounded in one of the previous loops. The two must struggle against each other to achieve their conflicting goals. Khaliq needs to stop the political gathering which would prevent Arivazhagan's public assassination and foil any possibility of a religious riot while Dhanushkodi needs to prevent Khaliq from doing so. 

Dhanushkodi is revealed to be working for Paranthaman, a veteran aide of Arivazhagan, who is unhappy with the nepotism inside his party. Paranthaman wants to get to power by assassinating Arivazhagan and Dhanushkodi expects to benefit from such a transfer of power by orchestrating the assassination. Khaliq is given a final warning by Dhanushkodi to stay away from his assassination and resets the loop. Khaliq attempts to warn Arivazhagan's son Mugilan of the impending assassination. On failing to do so, Khaliq eventually figures out Tamizhvanan, a local Hindu figurehead already knew of Paranthaman's plans to assassinate Arivazhagan. Tamizhvanan was murdered earlier that day. 

On knowing Arivazhagan and Tamizhvanan are close, Khaliq realizes that he needs to save Tamizhvanan and get him to warn Arivazhagan to prevent the gathering. After many futile attempts and loops, Khaliq successfully kidnaps Tamizhvanan and avoids Tamizhvanan himself to get murdered. He convinces Tamizhanan about Arivazhagan's impending assassination. Tamizhvanan helps Khaliq get to Arivazhagan but is captured by the police during a police chase. Khaliq smuggles himself into the memorial service of Kalaiselvanar (Arivazhagan's predecessor and former CM) where Arivazhagan, Mugilan, and Paranthaman attend the following afternoon. Khaliq convinces Arivazghan that an assassination was being planned by showing a video where Tamizhanan explains Arivazhagan to trust Khaliq. 

Arivazhagan confronts Paranthaman by acting like he is suffering from sudden palpitation. He is convinced that Khaliq is telling the truth after Paranthaman pleas for him to attend the conference. A fight ensure between Khaliq and Dhanushkodi. Mugilan is shot, but successfully warns his guards, who come straight into action, Paranthaman attempts to suffocate Arivazhagan, but is killed by Khaliq. Dhanushkodi tries to kill Arivazhagan but Khaliq takes the bullet and saves him. Dhanushkodi is killed by the guards. Mugilan and Khaliq recover and Arivazghan thank Khaliq for saving his life. Khaliq seemingly ends his time-loop. Paranthaman's death is chalked up to be cardiac arrest for political reasons. When Mansoor arrives, Khaliq stands to face him. 

In the post-credits scene, Khaliq awakens to find the time loop has still not ended.

Cast 

The bus stand portrait of late actor Manivannan is featured in the film as Kalaiselvanar, the predecessor of Arivazhagan in his political party.

Production

Pre-production 
Venkat Prabhu initially planned to collaborate with Silambarasan for Billa 3, the third instalment in the Billa film series, which came under the news in late 2016. With Prabhu failing to helm the project, because of his ongoing commitments with his directorial Party, Silambarasan decided to direct the film by himself, after a hiatus of nearly ten years, since Vallavan (2006). Silambarasan then decided to revive his shelved project Kettavan. The project was expected to take place in July 2017, with shooting being held at Mumbai and the United States, but failed to materialise then.

Development 
In June 2018, producer Suresh Kamatchi of V House Productions, officially confirmed their next venture with Silambarsan and Venkat Prabhu. The project was not considered to be the third instalment of Billa but another fresh script written by Prabhu; though it was rumoured to be a gangster film, it was later revealed to be an action-thriller instead. On 9 July 2018, Venkat Prabhu announced the title of the film as Maanadu, with a poster release, revealing that the film will be based on political backdrop. Venkat Prabhu added that the film would be a political thriller, his first attempt at the genre. The film, however, uses this as a subplot for the film whilst the story revolves around time loop, a first-of-a-kind in Tamil and Indian cinema; this had been kept under wraps by the team during the promotions for the film.

Despite few developments in the project, in August 2019, Suresh Kamatchi announced that he had ousted Silambarasan from the film citing the actor's failure to commit to dates properly, although the film had undergone pre-production work for close to a year before Silambarasan's exit. The producer claimed that the film will go on production with another actor in the lead role, while Silambarasan later chose to launch another new project titled Maghaa Maanaadu immediately after his removal from Maanaadu. Suresh Kamatchi, along with several other producers came forward with an official complaint to the Tamil Film Producers Council about Silambarasan's poor punctuality during the same month. In November 2019, the producers announced that Silambarasan would come back to the project after sorting out the issues, and the project was expected to be re-launched.

Casting 
With the film's cast and crew not being announced yet, it was rumoured that A. R. Rahman was being approached to compose the music and P. C. Sreeram being hired as the cinematographer. In January 2019, Raashi Khanna, was in talks to play the female lead, however Kalyani Priyadarshan, who paired up with Sivakarthikeyan in Hero (2019), was later cast. In June 2019, Yuvan Shankar Raja, who is known for his successful collaborations with Silambarasan and Venkat Prabhu, signed in as the composer.

In January 2020, the makers announced the complete cast and crew, which includes S. A. Chandrasekhar, Bharathiraja, Premgi Amaren and Karunakaran, along with cinematographer Richard M. Nathan, editor Praveen K. L., action director Stunt Silva and costume designer Vasuki Bhaskar, being a part of the project. Furthermore, the team also included S. J. Suryah, Manoj Bharathiraja, Daniel Annie Pope and Y. G. Mahendran, to the film's cast. Prabhu initially wanted Arvind Swamy to play the DCP Dhanushkodi, but he could not allot dates, resulting in Suryah being cast. Silambarasan was reported to play a Muslim in the film, whose character name was revealed as "Abdul Khaaliq" with a poster release on Silambarasan's birthday, 3 February 2020. It is a reference to Abdul Haliq, the legal name of Yuvan Shankar Raja following his conversion to Islam in 2014. Badava Gopi joined the film's sets during the filming schedule in Pondicherry in November 2020.

Filming 
Principal photography commenced on 19 February 2020 with a customary pooja ceremony being held on Chennai, where the team planned to few scenes in the venue and move to Hyderabad for a 40-day schedule. Following the accident held on the sets of Indian 2, the producer Suresh Kamatchi had assured an insurance of  crores to the film's cast and crew, also ensuring the safety of the workers on the film sets. On 27 February 2020, the team moved to VGP Golden Beach at Chennai, for a song shoot featuring Silambarasan which was choreographed by Raju Sundaram, was being filmed at a huge set with around 200 dancers from Mumbai and Bangalore.

The team later moved to Ramoji Film City at Hyderabad on 11 March for the film's second schedule. However, the film council in Hyderabad declined permission to shoot the film until 19 March for safety reasons due to the COVID-19 pandemic, thus the film's shooting being put on hold. Later the shooting of the film resumed at Pondicherry on 9 November 2020, with Silambarasan joining the sets post the completion of his film Eeswaran (2021). The schedule took place for a month and was completed within 9 December 2020. The team headed to Yercaud on 25 December 2020, to shoot major sequences without featuring Silambarasan.

A huge set was erected at the EVP Film City in Chennai, resembling a political gathering, and several lead stars were part of this schedule. The set works began in mid-February 2021 and took place for more than a month. Venkat Prabhu revealed that it was a challenging one to shoot a sequence with lot of artistes involved during this pandemic situation. He further added that the team planned to shoot this sequence in a quick time, citing the rise of COVID-19 infections in Chennai following the hot weather in the city. The shooting of the schedule was wrapped up on 5 April 2021, and then planned for another sequence to be filmed in Maldives airport, but was delayed further since the government had imposed ban on passengers from India arriving in the country due to surge in COVID-19 cases. After the statewide lockdown due to second wave of COVID-19 pandemic, the team later shifted to Hosur Aerodrome on 6 July 2021 for the final schedule and filming was completed on 9 July 2021. The production team eventually planned to shoot the entire film in 85 days, but filming was completed within 68 days.

Post-production 
The post-production began in July 2021, soon after the completion of the film. In September 2021, according to a report, the film "is shot in several locations, with a huge political gathering scene in the film, it requires almost 900 computer graphic shots". Silambarasan started dubbing for the film in May 2021, earlier before the post-production works, with the dubbing took place in his home studio. In mid-October 2021, Premgi Amaren completed dubbing for his portions for the film. The following day, S. J. Suryah started dubbing for his portions in the film and completed within five days. However, it was reported that Silambarasan refused to dub for the portions in the film, citing pending renumeration. Suresh Kamatchi, assured Silambarasan to pay him  as the remainder, which convinced the actor, and had completed dubbing for the remaining portions of his film, within a day. Yuvan started re-recording for the film's music and score in August 2021, which was completed within early-October 2021. The final copy of the film was submitted to the Central Board of Film Certification and was received U/A certificate (in concern of few action sequences) with a runtime of 147 minutes.

Themes and influences 
Following the official teaser, which released on Silambarasan's birthday (3 February 2021), netizens and fans of the actor claimed uncanny comparisons have been made to that of the American film Tenet (2020), directed by Christopher Nolan, as the frames from the teaser had made the use of reverse editing, as it deals with reverse-time formula. However, Venkat Prabhu refused such claims saying that it has no connection to that film. In the trailer, it was revealed that the film is based on a time loop concept (a common trope used in science-fiction films), where two characters were forced to repeat the same day after an unfortunate incident. It is the second Indian film to deal with the concept of time loops after Jango, released earlier the same year. Prabhu acknowledged Groundhog Day (1993) and Vantage Point (2008) as influences on Maanaadu.

Apart from time-loop, the film explores the concept of on Islamophobia, the demolition of the Babri Masjid, and how Muslims are being alienated. It was reported to normalise Muslim identity and mount opposition to anti-Muslim rhetoric and prejudice. Silambarasan said in February 2021, saying that "I have faith in God but not any particular religion. Generally, there is a misconception about Muslims in society and I wanted to do something to change it. Maanaadu will clear the misconception about the religion and its followers."

Music 

The film's soundtrack is composed by Yuvan Shankar Raja, after regularly collaborating with Venkat Prabhu and Silambarasan. The soundtrack album consists of seven tracks — only two songs, titled "Meherezylaa" and "Voice of Unity" (the latter was used as a promotional song and not featured in the film), and few instrumentals used in the background score were released along with the album. The track "Meherezylaa" was released on the occasion of World Music Day (21 June 2021), with the entire cast and crew being present at the Twitter Spaces to launch the track from the album. The promotional song "Voice of Unity" was released at an event held in Chennai. The soundtrack album was released by U1 Records on 7 November 2021, to positive response.

Release

Theatrical 
Maanadu was earlier scheduled for a theatrical release on 14 May 2021 (Eid-al-Fitr) but due to the extensive post-production activities the film's released was postponed to August 2021, which was further delayed due to the COVID-19 restrictions. On 11 September 2021, it was announced that the film would be released in five Indian languages on 4 November 2021, during Diwali. Suresh Kamatchi said that the extensive visual effects work delayed the post-production process, thereby resulting in the film being scheduled for release on that date.

However, on 18 October 2021, he announced that the film will be postponed to 25 November 2021, in order to ensure a wider release and large number of screens being provided for the film, thereby avoiding clash with Rajinikanth-starrer Annaatthe (2021), which also scheduled for release on the same day. The decision was made to avoid losses for the stake holders involved, according to the producer Suresh Kamatchi. Furthermore, the issues revolving over the film's copyrights and Silambarasan's refusal to dub for the film, citing his pending renumeration, were the reasons for the delay.

Distribution 
The Tamil Nadu theatrical rights were acquired by Subbiah Shanmugham of SSI Productions. Seyons International acquired the rights for distributing the film in countries such as United States, Canada, United Kingdom, Europe, Australia and Africa. Scandinavian Tamil Media Group AS acquired the rights for distributing the film in countries such as Norway, Sweden and Denmark. DMY Productions and BMN acquired the theatrical marketing rights in Malaysia and Sri Lanka regions. United India Exports purchased the distribution rights in Singapore and Gulf regions respectively.

Allu Aravind's Geetha Arts had acquired the rights of the film to be presented in Andhra Pradesh and Telangana regions, which was called off in favour of a Telugu remake. In mid-November, it was reported Great India Films will distribute the film in the United States. The theatrical rights in Kerala, were purchased by Mukesh R. Mehta of E4 Entertainment. AV Media Consultancy purchased the Karnataka theatrical rights, while UFO Moviez acquired the distribution rights in North India.

Home media 
The post-theatrical streaming rights of the film were bought by SonyLIV, and it was premiered through the streaming service on 24 December 2021, four weeks after the film's theatrical premiere. Initially, Kalaignar TV was reported to acquire the satellite rights, but it was later sold to Star Vijay.

Controversies

Legal issues from TFPC 
T. Rajendar and Usha Rajendar, Silambarasan's parents, filed a police complaint against the Tamil Film Producers Council for the film's postponement, over the issues revolving Anbanavan Asaradhavan Adangadhavan (2017). It has been reported that one of the members from the council demanded Silambarasan to compensate the losses incurred by the film's producer Michael Rayappan after its failure, and they even tried to send death threats to the actor, if he releases the film without refunding the dues. They also warned that they might stage protests outside the office of Chief Minister of Tamil Nadu, M. K. Stalin, if the perpetuators stop the film's release.

At the pre-release event held in November 2021, Silambarasan gave an emotional speech referring to his controversies concerning both his personal and professional life, as many producers in the past few months, have filed complaints against the actor at the South Indian Film Chamber of Commerce over multiple issues. In the event, he said that "I've faced a lot of problems in the past few months. But, I will take care of them. You guys [fans] should take care of me."

Financial problems 
On 24 November 2021, a day before the film's scheduled release, Suresh Kamatchi announced that the film had been postponed due to reasons involving financial settlements within the distributors and film financier Uttam Chand. It received a shocking response from the actor's fans and trade industry sources, as the film had a tremendous response at the pre-sale bookings in advance, and analysts believed that the film will be the "biggest opener for Simbu at the box office". The night of the same day, DMK MLA Udhayanidhi Stalin, had arranged a meeting with the producers and financiers to clear the dues, which was eventually solved quick and the film was released as scheduled. Despite financial settlements being done, the film's early morning shows, scheduled for 5:00 A.M. were cancelled as the Key Delivery Message (KDM) did not arrive in time, as planned and the first show began at 8:30 A.M.

Satellite rights ownership issue 
In December 2021, T. Rajendar filed a case regarding the price negotiations of satellite rights, where he had claimed the ownership for the same name. In his complaint, it has been stated that he was involved in sorting out the release issues of the film and had apparently signed a guarantee letter to take responsibility for the amount that needed to be paid to Uttam Chand. Both the parties have agreed upon Rajendar taking responsibilities for the remainder to be paid after negotiating deals for satellite and digital streaming rights. But the deal was negotiated without his consent, where he was not present during the price negotiation. In response, the Tamil Film Active Producers Council, headed by director Bharathiraja condemned Rajendar's actions for claiming the film's satellite rights as a very false precedent and said that how a guarantor apply for a license for the property whether it is fair for a reputable artist in the film industry". He strongly claimed that no one is in charge of a traditional business organization.

Protests from Bharatiya Janata Party 
The Bharatiya Janata Party's minority wing opposed the film claiming that it portrays Muslims in bad light and asked the Chief Minister to ban it. The affair ended with BJP's Tamil Nadu state president Annamalai K restraining BJP cadres and members from making further claims (or) criticism of the film, calling it a harmless entertainment film made with good intentions and sealed the issue.

Reception

Box office 
On the opening day of its release, the film crossed  in Tamil Nadu. In the Chennai city box-office, the film collected . The film earned US$100,000 ( lakh) from preview shows in United States held on 24 November, a day before the film's release in India. The film was considered to become a profitable venture, as it achieved break-even within four days of its release. At the end of the first week, the film earned . The film is the third highest-grossing Tamil film of 2021, behind Master and Annaatthe.

Critical response 
The film received positive reviews from critics and audience. M. Suganth of The Times of India gave a rating of 4 out on 5 and wrote "Venkat Prabhu superbly Indian-ises the time loop concept and delivers an edge-of-the-seat masala movie. After the set-up, the film moves at a breakneck pace, hardly letting go of either momentum and drama." Srivatsan S. of The Hindu stated that, "[Venkat Prabhu] takes a mainstream Hollywood trope and converts it into a masala film, thereby making the final product look refined [...] Part of the reason why Maanaadu is thrilling is because, in essence, it is good masala that hides behind the facade of time-loop". Sudhir Srinivasan of Cinema Express rated the same and said "Maanaadu has two stars—TR Silambarasan and SJ Suryah—and no duets, love stories, punch dialogues, or why, even fight sequences that threaten your suspension of disbelief. Venkat Prabhu reposes his faith squarely in the joys emergent from the time-loop idea and brings out an ace each time. Every time Khaaliq dies and gets reborn, the story explores a new idea. And yet, Venkat Prabhu manages to tie all these iterations and their events into a clever mystery that must be solved by Khaaliq, one step at a time." Ranjani Krishnakumar of Film Companion wrote, "Maanaadu is entertaining not because the two leads are smart, but because they are ridiculously ordinary [...] Maanaadu is not the best sci-fi film you’ll ever see. In fact, it’s hardly the genre film. It’s a mainstream film that uses a sci-fi trope for its convenience."

Haricharan Pudipeddi of Hindustan Times praised the film, saying that "Maanaadu highly enjoyable is that each iteration of the same scene is presented in a way that it isn't boring and there's something new to offer to the viewers each time. Another interesting perspective is that the time loop is told from the hero's point of view in the first half and from the villain's standpoint post interval. SJ Suryah as the antagonist is unbelievably good. Very few actors can so effectively make even over-the-top performances stand out, and Suryah is brilliant throughout the movie. The scenes in which he's trying to understand why he's stuck in a time loop while trying to get a grip over reality leaves the audiences in splits." Manoj Kumar of The Indian Express gave a rating of 3.5 out on 5 and wrote, "Director Venkat Prabhu has several catchy ideas and has engagingly strung them together. The endless loop and the seemingly endless efforts of the protagonists to get out of the time trap has an innate novelty to it. You respond to such movies like many characters in these films as if you are watching such a concept for the first time. We don't get bothered by the last film with the same theme as long as the current movie is enjoyable." Vivek of Deccan Herald rated the film with 3.5 out of 5 stars, stating that "Maanaadu doesn't begin extraordinarily but once it gets into its groove, it doesn't have dull moments. Full marks to Venkat for cleverly using a complicated concept in a 'masala film' template and emerging a winner." Sowmya Rajendran, chief editor of The News Minute gave 4 out of 5 stars and wrote, "The film's willingness to respect the audience's intelligence is charming".

Behindwoods gave the film positive review 3/5, writing "Overall Maanaadu is a well made political film that wants you to take its politics seriously, while justifying the humour and science fiction tag." Sify gave a rating of 3.5 out on 5 and wrote, "Maanaadu has a few minor flaws, but the film is engaging and entertaining with a high concept core theme" with the final verdict as "A time loop film for the masses." Bharat Kumar of News Today called the film, "Touted as a political thriller, the movie has enough elements to engage the audience. With Silambarasan back in the scheme of things and a strong antagonist in SJ Suryah, Venkat Prabhu has won the battle before it begins." Sujatha Narayanan of The Quint wrote "Maanaadu is that film for Venkat Prabhu where the film’s potential for a super-hit was written large in the first look poster itself [...] The ingenuity of the writing and direction lies in making a Nolan-esque film accessible to the common man."

A review from ABP News called the film a decent entertainer narrated with great skill. Akshay Kumar of DT Next gave a rating of 3.5 out on 5 and wrote, "The film is not without flaws, the reason why Silambarasan is stuck in a time-loop could have been better and why SJ Suriya is stuck along with Simbu in the loop is not clear. With the fast-paced screenplay you will forgive and forget the logic loopholes and enjoy the film which is the actor's best since Vinnaithaandi Varuvaayaa (2010) and Venkat Prabhu's best since Mankatha (2011)." Ashwin Ram of Moviecrow rated the film with 3.5/5 stars, praising the director "Trendy director Venkat Prabhu proves his mettle again by coming up with an experimental high concept entertainer that's delivered in a simplified manner. A smartly packaged commercial crowd-pleaser, sets fireworks on-screen and takes us back to the crazy Diwali mood."

Impact 
Maanaadu received unanimous praise from celebrities, with Rajinikanth appreciating Venkat Prabhu for the unique concept and making. Later, Sivakarthikeyan appreciated the team and also congratulated Prabhu for his "neat execution" in the film. Director S. Shankar took to Twitter to appreciate the film and Prabhu for the concept, he further heaped praise on the technical departments as "everyone was at their best", calling the film as "an entertaining and new experience for Tamil cinema". Praveen Sudevan, writing for The Hindu, compared the similarites for Maanaadu with that of Master and Doctor, as both the films have "solid antagonists", noting that S. J. Suryah's character Dhanushkodi, a ruthless cop "outwits the protagonist for most of the film" and added that "his performance equally contributed to the film’s success as Silambarasan's". He further heaped praise on Prabhu for "putting the hero and the villain on a level playing field". Maanaadu was further listed as one of the best Tamil films of 2021, by news articles, which include: Firstpost (Ashameera Aiyappan), The Indian Express (Manoj Kumar R.), The News Minute (Sowmya Rajendran) and Hindustan Times (Haricharan Pudipeddi).

Sequel 
Following the success of the film, in December 2021, Venkat Prabhu confirmed a sequel to the film with Silambarasan and S.J. Suryah returning. Prabhu added that the basic plot revolves around Khaliq going back to the loop resulting in Dhanushkodi returning to life.

Remakes 
In March, Venkat Prabhu said he planned to direct both the Hindi and Telugu remakes simultaneously with different star casts.

See also 
 List of films featuring time loops

References

External links 
 

2020s political thriller films
2021 action thriller films
2021 films
2021 science fiction films
Film productions suspended due to the COVID-19 pandemic
Films directed by Venkat Prabhu
Films scored by Yuvan Shankar Raja
Films set in Chennai
Films shot in Chennai
Films shot in Puducherry
Indian action thriller films
Indian political thriller films
Indian science fiction action films
Politics in fiction
Time loop films